α-Cyano-4-hydroxycinnamic acid, also written as alpha-cyano-4-hydroxycinnamic acid and abbreviated CHCA or HCCA, is a cinnamic acid derivative and is a member of the phenylpropanoid family. The carboxylate form is α-cyano-4-hydroxycinnamate.

Matrix-assisted laser desorption/ionization
α-Cyano-4-hydroxycinnamic acid is used as a matrix for peptides and nucleotides in MALDI mass spectrometry analyses.

See also 
Sinapinic acid

References  

Hydroxycinnamic acids
Phenols
Phenylpropanoids
Conjugated nitriles
Vinylogous carboxylic acids